Berahma (also Romanized as Berahmā, Barāmu, Barumo, Bārūmū, and Bormā) is a village in Khaveh-ye Jonubi Rural District, in the Central District of Delfan County, Lorestan Province, Iran. At the 2006 census, its population was 632, in 136 families.

References 

Towns and villages in Delfan County